Eustace Osler Katagira (born 14 July 1948) is a Tanzanian CCM politician and Member of Parliament for Kyerwa constituency since 2005.

References

1948 births
Living people
Tanzanian accountants
Chama Cha Mapinduzi MPs
Tanzanian MPs 2005–2010
Tanzanian MPs 2010–2015
Ihungo Secondary School alumni